myFootpath, LLC is a Chicago-based, privately held company that assists prospective students of all ages figure out their next step in life. The company's resources offer information on colleges, degree programs, career choices, graduate schools, and non-traditional career paths, such as gap year or volunteer experiences.

Founded by high school guidance counselors, the company's resources include the myFootpath College Advisor Hotline, which provides consultative advice on degree programs over the telephone, and a website, which offers information on career profiles, salaries, educational requirements, job information and advice, and degree programs. Visitors can also submit career and educational questions to advisors in the "Question & Answer" section of the site, and elect to receive information from schools offering degrees and programs in their area of study.

myFootpath created and built another web property used in high schools called Prep HeadQuarters. Prep HeadQuarters is used by hundreds of high schools, thousands of counselors, and hundreds of thousands of students nationwide to help with college and career planning. myFootpath sold Prep HeadQuarters in mid-2008.

In June 2004, the company received the Quintessential Careers Site Award in recognition for its efforts in helping job-seekers.

References

External links 
 

Education companies of the United States